The Institute for Policy Studies (IPS) is an American progressive think tank started in 1963 that is based in Washington, D.C. It was directed by John Cavanagh from 1998 to 2021. In 2021 Tope Folarin was announced as new Executive Director. It focuses on U.S. foreign policy, domestic policy, human rights, international economics, and national security.

IPS has been described as one of the five major independent think tanks in Washington.
Members of the IPS played key roles in the civil rights and anti-war movements of the 1960s, in the women's and environmental movements of the 1970s, and in the peace, anti-apartheid, and anti-intervention movements of the 1980s.

History

1960s 

The Institute for Policy Studies was founded in 1963 by Marcus Raskin and Richard Barnet as the think tank for "the most powerful of the powerless," according to a 2009 Carnegie Report. The founders were officials in the John F. Kennedy administration —Raskin, then in his twenties, was working as a White House aide for McGeorge Bundy, and Barnet served in a similar role to John J. McCloy. They had become disillusioned by priorities based on politics rather than moral issues.

Against the backdrop of the counterculture of the 1960s, the opposition to United States involvement in the Vietnam War, and the civil rights movement of the 1960s, the Institute for Policy Studies "became a brand name for its unabashedly left-wing tone" in contrast with RAND and the largely conservative think tanks. Members of these movements came to IPS headquarters in Washington, D.C.'s Dupont Circle. In a 2009 interview, Raskin said, "Very quickly, with the Vietnam war, the civil rights movement, the women’s movement, the institute became a place where different people from the movements came. People came in from demonstrations" and "camped out in the offices. Early on [the IPS] had predicted that Vietnam would be a disaster." During the presidency of Lyndon Johnson, Raskin was indicted by the federal government for the 1965 publication of "tens of thousands of copies of an IPS anti-war Vietnam Reader"—a kind of textbook for anti-war teach-ins. He was charged with encouraging people to resist the draft. In 1967, Raskin and IPS Fellow Arthur Waskow penned "A Call to Resist Illegitimate Authority", a document signed by dozens of scholars and religious leaders which helped to launch the draft resistance movement.

In 1964, several leading African-American activists joined the institute's staff and turned IPS into a base for supporting for the Civil Rights Movement. Fellow Bob Moses organized trainings for field organizers of the Student Nonviolent Coordinating Committee on the links between civil rights theory and practice, while Ivanhoe Donaldson initiated an assembly of African-American government officials. Port Huron SDS co-writer and civil rights veteran, IPS Fellow Robb Burlage launched the critical health care justice movement in 1967 with his "Burlage Report". Later Burlage founded the Health Policy Advisory Center, which published the initially monthly bulletin, Health/Pac Bulletin, first in 1968 and thereafter semi-annually and eventually quarterly for nearly 3 decades.

The IPS was also at the forefront of the feminist movement. Fellow Charlotte Bunch organized a significant women's liberation conference in 1966 and later launched two feminist periodicals, Quest and Off Our Backs. Rita Mae Brown wrote and published her notable lesbian coming-of-age novel Rubyfruit Jungle while on the staff in the 1970s.

Raskin's 2018 obituary in The Nation said that for him, "ideas were the seedlings for effective action."

IPS also organized congressional seminars and published numerous books that challenged the national security state, including Gar Alperovitz’s Atomic Diplomacy and Barnet's Intervention and Revolution. IPS was the object of repeated FBI and Internal Revenue Service probes. The Nixon administration placed Barnet and Raskin on its Enemies List.

1970s
In 1971, Raskin received "a mountain of paper" from a source that was later identified as Daniel Ellsberg. These became known as the Pentagon Papers. Raskin played his "customary catalytic role" by putting Ellsberg in touch with New York Times reporter Neil Sheehan.

In 1974, the institute created an Organizing Committee for the Fifth Estate as part of its Center for National Security Studies which published the magazine CounterSpy until 1984.

In 1976, agents of Chilean dictator Augusto Pinochet assassinated two IPS members of staff on Washington's Embassy Row. The target of the car bomb attack was Orlando Letelier, a former Chilean government minister and ambassador to the United States, one of Pinochet's most outspoken critics and the head of IPS's sister organization, the Transnational Institute (TNI). Ronni Karpen Moffitt, a 25-year-old IPS development associate, was also killed.

The Institute for Policy Studies hosts an annual human rights award in the names of Letelier and Moffitt to honor them while celebrating new heroes of the human rights movement from the United States and elsewhere in the Americas. The award recipients receive the Letelier-Moffitt Human Rights Award.

The Transnational Institute, an international progressive think tank based in Amsterdam, was originally established as the IPS's international program, although it became independent in 1973.

In its attention to the role of multinational corporations, it was also an early critic of what has come to be called globalization. Richard Barnet's 1974 examination of the power of multinational corporations, Global Reach, was one of the first books on the subject.

1980s
In the 1980s, Raskin served as chair of the SANE/Freeze campaign.

In the 1980s, IPS became heavily involved in supporting the movement against U.S. intervention in Central America. IPS Director Robert Borosage and other staff helped draft Changing Course: Blueprint for Peace in Central America and the Caribbean, which was used by hundreds of schools, labor unions, churches, and citizen organizations as a challenge to U.S. policy in the region.

In 1985, Fellow Roger Wilkins helped found the Free South Africa Movement, which organized a year-long series of demonstrations that led to the imposition of U.S. sanctions. In 1987, S. Steven Powell published his non-fiction Covert Cadre: Inside the Institute for Policy Studies in which he "providing by far the single most compendious collection of facts about IPS that anyone has yet compiled" according to a lengthy critical review by Joshua Muravchik.

In 1986, after six years of the Reagan administration, Sidney Blumenthal said that "Ironically, as IPS has declined in Washington influence, its stature has grown in conservative demonology. In the Reagan era, the institute has loomed as a right-wing obsession and received most of its publicity by serving as a target."

Conservative think tanks American Enterprise Institute and The Heritage Foundation described the IPS as the "far left" or "radical left" of the late 1980s, the another conservative think tank, who engaged in what the author Joshua Muravchik coined as "communophilism".

In his 1988 book Far Left of Center: The American Radical Left Today, Emory University professor Harvey Klehr said that IPS "serves as an intellectual nerve center for the radical movement, ranging from nuclear and anti-intervention issues to support for Marxist insurgencies".

1990s
In the early 1990s, IPS began monitoring the environmental impacts of U.S. trade, investment, and drug policies.

Administration

Fellows
Sarah Anderson
Ajamu Baraka
Phyllis Bennis
John Cavanagh
Karen Dolan
Robb K. Burlage
John Kiriakou
Saul Landau
Marcus Raskin 
Sanho Tree
Daphne Wysham

Senior scholars
Maude Barlow
Norman Birnbaum
Noam Chomsky
Steve Cobble
Chuck Collins
Barbara Ehrenreich
Paul Epstein
Richard Falk
Bill Fletcher
Andy Levine
Jerry Mander
Jack O'Dell
Vandana Shiva

Funding
Start-up funding was secured from the Sears heir, Philip M. Stern, and banker, James Warburg. Most of the money came from a foundation of Samuel Rubin.

Notes

References

Further reading

External links
 
 The Letelier-Moffitt Human Rights Awards
 Folder Inventory to the Marcus Raskin Papers, Special Collections Research Center, Estelle and Melvin Gelman Library, The George Washington University

Political and economic think tanks in the United States
Progressive organizations in the United States
Non-profit organizations based in Washington, D.C.
1963 establishments in Washington, D.C.
Think tanks established in 1963